The Big Family is a 1973 Italian mafia film written and directed  by Tonino Ricci and starring Raymond Pellegrin, Simonetta Stefanelli and Richard Conte.

Plot

Cast

Raymond Pellegrin as Don Peppino Scalise
Simonetta Stefanelli as Signora Vitale
Giancarlo Prete as  Inspector La Manna
Richard Conte as Don Antonio Marchesi
Maria Fiore as Miss Federici
Edmund Purdom as  Giovanni Lutture
 Aldo Barberito as  Federici
Pino Ferrara as Fiorito
Sal Borgese as  Turi
Stelio Candelli  as Johnny DeSalvo
Umberto Spadaro as  Carabinieri Marshall			
Franco Fantasia as Chief of Police 		
 Empedocle Buzzanca  as Alfio Sorge

References

External links

The Big Family at Variety Distribution

Italian crime films
1970s crime films
Films about the Sicilian Mafia
Films scored by Bruno Nicolai
1970s Italian-language films
1970s Italian films